England competed at the 1986 Commonwealth Games in Edinburgh, Scotland, between 24 July and 2 August 1986.

England finished top of the medal table.

Medal table (top three)

The athletes that competed are listed below.

Athletics

Badminton

Bowls

Boxing

Cycling

Diving

Rowing

Shooting

Swimming

Synchronised swimming

Weightlifting

Wrestling

References

1986
Nations at the 1986 Commonwealth Games
Commonwealth Games